is a Paralympic swimmer from Japan competing mainly in category SB3 events.

Noriko competed in four Paralympic games winning two gold medals and a bronze.  At her first games in 1996 Summer Paralympics she won gold in the 50m breaststroke having set a world record in the heat and then improving by over a second in the final.  She also finished as ninth fastest in the heats of the 50m freestyle narrowly missing out on a final place, finished eighth in both the 50m backstroke and 100m freestyle finals. In the 2000 Summer Paralympics she could only manage eighth in the 100m breaststroke final and finished sixth in her heat of the 50m freestyle.  In the 2004 games Japan entered successful relay teams and Noriko was part of them winning gold in the 4x50m freestyle in a new world-record time and bronze in the 4x50m medley she also swam in the individual 100m breaststroke finishing fourth less than a quarter of a second behind France's Teresa Perales in bronze.  At her fourth games she competed in just the 100m breaststroke where she could only manage fifth.

References

External links
 

Paralympic swimmers of Japan
Swimmers at the 1996 Summer Paralympics
Swimmers at the 2000 Summer Paralympics
Swimmers at the 2004 Summer Paralympics
Swimmers at the 2008 Summer Paralympics
Paralympic gold medalists for Japan
Paralympic bronze medalists for Japan
Japanese female backstroke swimmers
Japanese female breaststroke swimmers
Japanese female freestyle swimmers
Living people
Medalists at the 1996 Summer Paralympics
Medalists at the 2004 Summer Paralympics
Year of birth missing (living people)
Paralympic medalists in swimming
S5-classified Paralympic swimmers